The Colombo South Teaching Hospital (also called Kalubowila Hospital) is located in Kalubowila, Sri Lanka and mainly targets the treatment of the Dengue virus. It is the second largest hospital in the country. It is a teaching-oriented hospital that maintains a bed strength of 1,110. The hospital covers most of the tertiary specialties and offers a variety of options for clinical electives, including forensic medicine.

History 
The Kalubowila Hospital was started on the 2 July 1960 by prime minister Sirimavo Bandaranaike, as a base hospital. The hospital was upgraded to a teaching hospital in 1995. Currently, it is the second largest government (national hospital) after the Colombo National Hospital.

The hospital has 1,100 beds. It provides treatment to about 150,000 inward patents and 750,000 out patient per year. It serves as the teaching hospital of the Faculty of Medical Science, University of Sri Jayewardenepura.

References 

1960 establishments in Ceylon
Central government hospitals in Sri Lanka
Hospital buildings completed in 1960
Teaching hospitals in Sri Lanka
University of Sri Jayewardenepura

Hospitals in Colombo District